District 27 of the Texas Senate is a senatorial district that currently serves all of Cameron, Kenedy, Kleberg and Willacy counties and a portion of Hidalgo county in the U.S. state of Texas.

The current Senator from District 27 is Eddie Lucio, Jr.

Top 5 biggest cities in district
District 27 has a population of 786,946 with 524,120 that is at voting age from the 2010 census.

Election history
Election history of District 27 from 1992.

Previous elections

2020

2016

2012

2008

2004

2002

2000

1996

1994

1992

District officeholders

Notes

References

27
Cameron County, Texas
Hidalgo County, Texas
Kenedy County, Texas
Kleberg County, Texas
Willacy County, Texas